Tim Lips (born 7 October 1985 in Made) is a Dutch eventer.

Biography
Both his parents were active in equestrian as well and Lips knew he wanted to be successful in the sport from a young age. Already at the age of 8 he was getting decent results in show jumping and he created experienced ponys out of total inexperienced ones. At the age of 19 he and his father decided to check if eventing could be a successful discipline for Lips. After a few tries he decided eventig would become his future sport. Besides his top horse Oncarlos Lips rides 8 to 10 horses a day in the professional accommodation in his home town of Made. These are his own horses, as well as other horses brought in by other people to prepare them for events. Lips is even in the position to enter the show jumping events himself with those horses from time to time. This gives him a continuous rhythm and he can prepare his horses for a 1.35m height, which makes sure the eventing heights are no problem for his horses. Lips is part of the A-class Seniors Eventing of the KNHS (The Royal Dutch Equestrian Association) as well as the Rabobank Talents Team, which is a project of the Rabobank and the KNHS to discover young talented riders at an early age.

Lips won two eventing races in the M-Class in 2005 both with Oncarlos, in IJsselstein and Barchem, he also reached a second place in Bathmen, also on Oncarlos. In 2006 he became second, in the CCI meeting in Jaroszwoka, Poland and third in Ede. On this last event he also became the Dutch national Young Rider champion. At the European Championships for Young Riders in Pardubice, Czech Republic he became fifteenth, but managed to get the award for Best Equestrian. He continued his year by winning a CIC event in Varsseveld and becoming second in Nichelino. He became 10th at the CIC event in Boekelo, 2007, but this was enough to claim the Dutch national title. During his first World Cup appearance in Fontainebleau he finished on the 30th position. In Ede he became 2nd in the CIC competition with Oncarlos and third in the CCI competition with Van Schijndel's Owaola. At the CICO in Aachen he finished in 13th position and with the Dutch team he finished in 5th position.

In April 2008 Lips and Oncarlos finished on the seventh position of the CCI race in Vairano. Later he became third in Outdoor Gelderland with Van Schijndels Owaola and in July he finished second in the CHIO Aachen, the World's largest equestrian meeting. This earned enough points to be among the top 30 at the World Rankings, which gave him the international nomination for the 2008 Summer Olympics. Because he also achieved the Dutch standards (finishing among the top 12 in this tournament) the qualification was a fact.

At the 2012 Summer Olympics, he finished in 38th place in the individual and was part of the Dutch team that finished in 11th place.

CCI 5* Results

International Championship results

External links
Official homepage

References

1985 births
Living people
Dutch dressage riders
Dutch show jumping riders
Event riders
Olympic equestrians of the Netherlands
Dutch male equestrians
Equestrians at the 2008 Summer Olympics
Equestrians at the 2012 Summer Olympics
Equestrians at the 2016 Summer Olympics
People from Drimmelen
Sportspeople from North Brabant
21st-century Dutch people